The 1928 Chicago White Sox season was a season in Major League Baseball. The team finished fifth in the American League with a record of 72-82, 29 games behind the pennant-winning New York Yankees.

Offseason

Notable transactions 
 November 5, 1927: The White Sox traded Ike Boone, Bert Cole, a player to be named later and $75,000 to the Portland Beavers for Bill Cissell. The White Sox completed the trade on February 6, 1928, by sending Ike Davis to the Beavers.

Regular season

Season standings

Record vs. opponents

Roster

Player stats

Batting

Starters by position 
Note: Pos = Position; G = Games played; AB = At bats; H = Hits; Avg. = Batting average; HR = Home runs; RBI = Runs batted in

Other batters 
Note: G = Games played; AB = At bats; H = Hits; Avg. = Batting average; HR = Home runs; RBI = Runs batted in

Pitching

Starting pitchers 
Note: G = Games pitched; IP = Innings pitched; W = Wins; L = Losses; ERA = Earned run average; SO = Strikeouts

Other pitchers 
Note: G = Games pitched; IP = Innings pitched; W = Wins; L = Losses; ERA = Earned run average; SO = Strikeouts

Relief pitchers 
Note: G = Games pitched; W = Wins; L = Losses; SV = Saves; ERA = Earned run average; SO = Strikeouts

References 
1928 Chicago White Sox at Baseball Reference

Chicago White Sox seasons
Chicago White Sox season
Chicago White